Sabrina Cinili (born April 22, 1989) is an Italian basketball player for Virtus Bologna and the Italian national team.

She participated at the EuroBasket Women 2017.

References

1989 births
Living people
Italian women's basketball players
Basketball players from Rome
Point guards